Brain-specific angiogenesis inhibitor 1-associated protein 2 is a protein that in humans is encoded by the BAIAP2 gene.

Function 

The protein encoded by this gene has been identified as a brain-specific angiogenesis inhibitor (BAI1)-binding protein.  This interaction at the cytoplasmic membrane is crucial to the function of this protein, which may be involved in neuronal growth-cone guidance.  This protein functions as an insulin receptor tyrosine kinase substrate and suggests a role for insulin in the central nervous system.  This protein has also been identified as interacting with the dentatorubral-pallidoluysian atrophy gene, which is associated with an autosomal dominant neurodegenerative disease. It also associates with a downstream effector of Rho small G proteins, which is associated with the formation of stress fibers and cytokinesis.  Alternative splicing of the 3'-end of this gene results in three products of undetermined function.

Interactions
BAIAP2 has been shown to interact with:

 ATN1, 
 CDC42,
 EPS8, 
 RAC1, 
 SHANK1, 
 WASF1,  and
 WASF2.

References

External links

Further reading